Santiam Lake is a lake in the U.S. state of Oregon, west of Three Fingered Jack in the Cascade Range.  It is headwaters for the North Santiam River and drains a portion of the southwestern Mount Jefferson Wilderness. The lake is stocked bi-annually with Brook and Rainbow trout. It can be accessed from various trails in the Jefferson Wilderness, including Santiam Lake Trail #3491. It is located about 6.5 miles northwest of Santiam Junction, Oregon.

See also
List of lakes in Oregon

References

Lakes of Oregon
Lakes of Linn County, Oregon
Willamette National Forest
Protected areas of Linn County, Oregon